The Walkerville Football Club, nicknamed the Cats, is an Australian rules football club that plays in the Adelaide Footy League and is based in Walkerville, Adelaide.

History 
The Walkerville Football Club was officially founded in 1901 but before then there have been previous Walkerville-based clubs. On 19 April 1876, there was a meeting to start a proposed Walkerville Football Club, and there was a Walkerville club that played at Gilberton in 1883. But the current club was founded in 1901 and took the field in 1902. The club played in the parkland area opposite the Buckingham Arms Hotel and wore red and white colours, playing on an oval located northwest to a field used by the North Adelaide Lacrosse Club. In 1911, the club recruited more men to play for them from the Walkerville Methodist Club, around the time when the club relocated its home ground to 'Pockers Paddock', a ground located on Smith Street, Walkerville. Known as Walkerville United, in 1912, the undefeated club was scheduled to play a match against West Adelaide in the South Australian National Football League but the game was never played.

The North Adelaide District Football Association was founded in 1921 where Walkerville was a founding member and went to win three of its first five premierships and remained in the North Adelaide association until it joined the South Australian Amateur Football League in 1936. Walkerville won the Division 2 flag against Eastwood and won another in 1940. The club's first Division 1 flag  was against Exeter in 1950, winning by 3 points. A second Division 1 flag followed in 1953 after minor premiers University lost to Exeter in their first semi final and played Walkerville who had beaten Exeter in the initial decider. The game was played at Alberton Oval and Walkerville won by 8 points. In 1955, the club changed to a new guernsey with royal blue and white hoops from a chocolate and blue guernsey and won a 1966 Division 5 flag prior to new clubrooms being built three years later, in 1969. The 1978 season saw the club relocate to Park 11 (Graduates Oval) in North Adelaide. The club amalgamated with North Adelaide Reserves in 1979 and joined the South Australian Football Association (SAFA) in 1980. The 1990 move back to the SAAFL saw the Cats a very successful era with three A-Grade premierships in 1990 (D6), 1992 (D4), and 1999 (D3), along with a C-Grade premiership and 6 reserves premierships before the club changed its guernsey again to the current navy blue and white hoops in 1998. After the 1992 Division 4 flag, Walkerville and Flinders Park became the only clubs to win premierships in all grades from Division 1 to Division 6.

Since the 2000s, Walkerville has won another three A-Grade premierships, two in Division 3 in 2003 and 2009 and one in Division 4 2020.

Guernsey 
The Walkerville Cats Senior Guernsey consists of white and navy blue horizontal stripes, similar to the Geelong Cats. The Juniors Guernsey are both the vertical hoops and a Baby Blue guernsey with a white sash and the junior logo in the middle.

Home Grounds 

 1901-1910 - Robe Terrace, Medindie (Opposite the Buckingham Arms Hotel)
 1911-1977 - 'Pockers Paddock', Smith Street, Walkerville
 1978 - Park 11 (Graduates Oval), North Adelaide
 1979–present - Walkerville Oval, Smith Street, Walkerville

References

External links 
 

Australian rules football clubs in South Australia
Adelaide Footy League clubs
Australian rules football clubs established in 1901
1901 establishments in Australia